is a Japan-exclusive fishing video game for the Super Famicom.

Summary

The player gets to fish with Hiroki Matsukata in exotic fishing venues around the world. These places include Mozambique, Cuba and Australia.

Once the player catches a fish, the player must fight it in order to make a successful catch. Whoever gets their bar to the farthest edge of the screen first loses the fight; the fish would become completely placid while the angler would lose his lure. The player is constantly accompanied by a female non-player character who occasionally offers advice. All maps have a specific name for each of the areas that have been allocated for fishing.

Japanese language text dominates the game. Like in most fishing games, players have a strict time limit. Different kinds of fishing lures are used in order to attract fish. Players must take their fishing vessel to different squares on a board in order to get to the fishing sequences. All measurements in the game use the metric system.

References

1995 video games
Atelier Double games
Cultural depictions of fishers
Cultural depictions of Japanese men
Fishing video games
Japan-exclusive video games
Single-player video games
Super Nintendo Entertainment System games
Super Nintendo Entertainment System-only games
Tonkin House games
Video games based on real people
Video games developed in Japan
Video games set in Australia
Video games set in Cuba
Video games set in Mozambique